Lagocheirus integer is a species of longhorn beetles of the subfamily Lamiinae. It was described by Bates in 1885, and is known from eastern Mexico to Panama.

References

Beetles described in 1885
Lagocheirus